The Aphrodite's Sanctuary Cycling Race is an annual professional road bicycle race for women in Cyprus.

Winners

References

Cycle races in Cyprus
Recurring sporting events established in 2019
Women's road bicycle races
Annual sporting events in Cyprus